The binturong (Arctictis binturong), also known as the bearcat, is a viverrid native to South and Southeast Asia. It is uncommon in much of its range, and has been assessed as Vulnerable on the IUCN Red List because of a declining population trend that is estimated at more than 30% since the mid-1980s. The binturong is the only living species in the genus Arctictis.

Etymology 
"Binturong" is its common name in Borneo, that is related to the Western Malayo-Polynesian root "ma-tuRun". In Riau, it is called 'benturong' and 'tenturun'. 
The scientific name Arctictis means 'bear-weasel', from Greek arkt- 'bear' + iktis 'weasel'.

Taxonomy
Viverra binturong was the scientific name proposed by Thomas Stamford Raffles in 1822 for a specimen from Malacca. The generic name Arctictis was proposed by Coenraad Jacob Temminck in 1824. Arctictis is a monotypic taxon; its morphology is similar to that of members of the genera Paradoxurus and Paguma.

In the 19th and 20th centuries, the following zoological specimens were described:
Paradoxurus albifrons proposed by Frédéric Cuvier in 1822 was based on a drawing of a binturong from Bhutan prepared by Alfred Duvaucel.
Arctictis penicillata by Temminck in 1835 were specimens from Sumatra and Java.
Arctictis whitei proposed by Joel Asaph Allen in 1910 were skins of two female binturongs collected in Palawan Island in the Philippines.
Arctictis pageli proposed by Ernst Schwarz in 1911 was a skin and skull of a female collected in northern Borneo.
Arctictis gairdneri proposed by Oldfield Thomas in 1916 was a skull of a male binturong collected in southwestern Thailand.
Arctictis niasensis proposed by Marcus Ward Lyon Jr. in 1916 was a binturong skin from Nias Island.
A. b. kerkhoveni by Henri Jacob Victor Sody in 1936 was based on specimens from Bangka Island.
A. b. menglaensis by Wang and Li in 1987 was based on specimens from the Yunnan Province in China.

Nine subspecies have been recognized forming two clades. The northern clade in mainland Asia is separated from the Sundaic clade by the Isthmus of Kra.

Characteristics

The binturong is long and heavy, with short, stout legs. It has a thick coat of coarse black hair. The bushy and prehensile tail is thick at the root, gradually tapering, and curls inwards at the tip. The muzzle is short and pointed, somewhat turned up at the nose, and is covered with bristly hairs, brown at the points, which lengthen as they diverge, and form a peculiar radiated circle round the face. The eyes are large, black and prominent. The ears are short, rounded, edged with white, and terminated by tufts of black hair. There are six short rounded incisors in each jaw, two canines, which are long and sharp, and six molars on each side. The hair on the legs is short and of a yellowish tinge. The feet are five-toed, with large strong claws; the soles are bare, and are plantigrade: applied to the ground throughout the whole of their length; the hind ones are longer than the fore ones.

In general build the binturong is essentially like Paradoxurus and Paguma, but more massive in the length of the tail, legs and feet, in the structure of the scent glands and larger size of the rhinarium, which is more convex with a median groove being much narrower above the philtrum. The contour hairs of the coat are much longer and coarser, and the long hairs clothing the whole of the back of the ears project beyond the tip as a definite tuft. The anterior bursa flap of the ears is more widely and less deeply emarginate. The tail is more muscular, especially at the base, and in colour generally like the body, but commonly paler at the base beneath. The body hairs are frequently partly whitish or buff, giving a speckled appearance to the pelage, sometimes so pale that the whole body is mostly straw-coloured or grey, the young being often at all events paler than the adults, but the head is always closely speckled with grey or buff. The long mystacial vibrissae are conspicuously white, and there is a white rim on the summit of the otherwise black ear. The glandular area is whitish.

Both sexes have scent glands; females on either side of the vulva, and males between the scrotum and penis. The musk glands emit an odor reminiscent of popcorn or corn chips, likely due to the volatile compound 2-acetyl-1-pyrroline in the urine, which is also produced in the Maillard reaction at high temperatures. Unlike most other carnivorans, the male binturong does not have a baculum.

Distribution and habitat
The binturong occurs from India, Nepal, Bangladesh, Bhutan, Myanmar, Thailand, Malaysia to Laos, Cambodia, Vietnam and Yunnan in China, and Sumatra, Kalimantan and Java in Indonesia to Palawan in the Philippines.
It is confined to tall forest.
In Assam, it is common in foothills and hills with good tree cover, but less so in the forested plains. It has been recorded in Manas National Park, in Dulung and Kakoi Reserved Forests of the Lakhimpur district, in the hill forests of Karbi Anglong, North Cachar Hills, Cachar and Hailakandi Districts.
In Thailand's Khao Yai National Park, several individuals were observed feeding in a fig tree and on a vine.
In Laos, they have been observed in extensive evergreen forest.
In Malaysia, binturongs were recorded in secondary forest surrounding a palm estate that was logged in the 1970s.

Ecology and behavior

The binturong is active during the day and at night. Three sightings in Pakke Tiger Reserve were by day. Thirteen camera trap photograph events in Myanmar involved one around dusk, seven in full night and five in broad daylight. All photographs were of single animals, and all were taken on the ground. As binturongs are not very nimble, they may have to descend to the ground relatively frequently when moving between trees.

Five radio-collared binturongs in the Phu Khieo Wildlife Sanctuary exhibited an arrhythmic activity dominated by crepuscular and nocturnal tendencies with peaks in the early morning and late evening. Reduced inactivity periods occurred from midday to late afternoon. Two males showed slightly larger ranges in the wet season. Their ranges overlapped between 30 and 70%.

The binturong is essentially arboreal. Pocock observed the behaviour of several captive individuals in the London Zoological Gardens. When resting they lie curled up, with the head tucked under the tail. They seldom leaped, but climbed skillfully, albeit slowly, progressing with equal ease and confidence along the upper side of branches or, upside down, beneath them. The prehensile tail was always ready as a help. They descended the vertical bars of the cage head first, gripping them between their paws and using the prehensile tail as a check. When irritated they growled fiercely. When on the prowl they periodically uttered a series of low grunts or a hissing sound made by expelling air through partially opened lips.

The binturong uses its tail to communicate.
It moves about gently, often coming to a stop, and often using the tail to keep balance, clinging to a branch. It shows a pronounced comfort behaviour associated with grooming the fur, shaking and licking the hair, and scratching. Shaking is the most characteristic element of comfort behaviour.

Diet 
The binturong is omnivorous, feeding on small mammals, birds, fish, earthworms, insects and fruits. It also preys on rodents. Fish and earthworms are likely unimportant items in its diet, as it is neither aquatic nor fossorial, coming across such prey only when opportunities present themselves. Since it does not have the attributes of a predatory mammal, most of the binturong's diet is probably of vegetable matter. Figs are a major component of its diet. Captive binturongs are particularly fond of plantains, but also eat fowls' heads and eggs.

The binturong is an important agent for seed dispersal, especially for those of the strangler fig, because of its ability to scarify the seed's tough outer covering.

In captivity, the binturong's diet includes commercially prepared meat mix, bananas, apples, oranges, canned peaches and mineral supplement.

Reproduction
The average age of sexual maturation is 30.4 months for females and 27.7 months for males. The estrous cycle of the binturong lasts 18 to 187 days, with an average of 82.5 days. Gestation lasts 84 to 99 days. Litter size in captivity varies from one to six young, with an average of two young per birth. Fertility lasts until 15 years of age.

The maximum known lifespan in captivity is thought to be over 25 years of age.

Threats

Major threats to the binturong are habitat loss and degradation of forests through logging and conversion of forests to non-forest land-uses throughout the binturong's range. Habitat loss has been severe in the lowlands of the Sundaic part of its range, and there is no evidence that the binturong uses the plantations that are largely replacing natural forest. In China, rampant deforestation and opportunistic logging practices have fragmented suitable habitat or eliminated sites altogether. In the Philippines, it is captured for the wildlife trade, and in the south of its range it is also taken for human consumption. In Laos, it is one of the most frequently displayed caged live carnivores and skins are traded frequently in at least Vientiane. In parts of Laos, it is considered a delicacy and also traded as a food item to Vietnam.

The Orang Asli of Malaysia has the tradition of keeping binturongs as pets.

Conservation 

The binturong is included in CITES Appendix III and in Schedule I of the Indian Wild Life (Protection) Act, 1972, so that it has the highest level of protection. In China, it is listed as critically endangered. It is completely protected  in Bangladesh, and partially in Thailand, Malaysia, and Vietnam. Licensed hunting of binturong is allowed in Indonesia, and it is not protected in Brunei.

World Binturong Day, an event dedicated to binturong awareness and conservation, takes place yearly every second Saturday of May.

In captivity 
Binturongs are common in zoos, and captive individuals represent a source of genetic diversity essential for long-term conservation. Their geographic origin is either usually unknown, or they are offspring of several generations of captive-bred animals.

References

External links

 
 
 
 

Viverrids
Carnivorans of Asia
Mammals of Bangladesh
Mammals of Bhutan
Mammals of China
Mammals of India
Mammals of Southeast Asia
Carnivorans of Malaysia
Vulnerable fauna of Asia
Mammals described in 1821